Tom Ward is a British film, stage and television actor.

Career
Ward is chiefly known for his role as Dr. Harry Cunningham in the long-running forensic drama series Silent Witness, a role he played for 10 years. He also featured in the Doctor Who Christmas special "The Snowmen" at the end of 2012, and in Death in Paradise in early 2013.

In December 2013, Ward played Colonel Fitzwilliam in a BBC television adaptation of Death Comes to Pemberley.

In December 2015, he appeared in Harry Price: Ghost Hunter, an ITV drama, alongside Rafe Spall and Cara Theobald.

Filmography

References

External links

Male actors from Swansea
People educated at The Dragon School
People educated at The King's School, Canterbury
Alumni of Lincoln College, Oxford
British male fencers
Living people
Welsh male television actors
Welsh male film actors
Welsh male stage actors
20th-century Welsh male actors
21st-century Welsh male actors
Year of birth missing (living people)